John A. Ryan  was a Major League Baseball pitcher. He played for the Baltimore Monumentals of the Union Association in the 1884 season. He also played for the Chattanooga Lookouts in the Southern League in 1885.

External links

Baltimore Monumentals players
Baseball players from Michigan
19th-century baseball players
Chattanooga Lookouts players
Year of death missing
Year of birth missing